The 2015–16 Regional Four Day Competition was the 50th edition of the Regional Four Day Competition, the domestic first-class cricket competition for the countries of the West Indies Cricket Board (WICB). The competition ran from 6 November 2015 to 18 March 2016.

Six teams contested the tournament – Barbados, Guyana, Jamaica, the Leeward Islands, Trinidad and Tobago, and the Windward Islands. Guyana were undefeated, winning eight of their ten matches and drawing the other two, and consequently won their eighth title (and second in a row). Jamaica's Nikita Miller was the leading wicket-taker, while Guyana's captain Leon Johnson led the competition in runs.

Teams

Points table

Fixtures

Statistics

Most runs
The top five run-scorers are included in this table, listed by runs scored and then by batting average.

Most wickets

The top five wicket-takers are listed in this table, listed by wickets taken and then by bowling average.

External links
 Competition information at ESPNcricinfo
 Competition information at CricketArchive

References

2015 in West Indian cricket
2016 in West Indian cricket
Regional Four Day Competition seasons
Regional Four Day Competition